Andrew Stone may refer to:

Sports
Andrew Stone (cricketer) (born 1983), Zimbabwean cricketer
Andrew Stone (field hockey) (born 1960), American field hockey player
Andrew Stone (soccer) (born 1990), American soccer player
Andrew Stone (sailor) (born 1969), New Zealand sailor
Lex Stone (Andrew Alexis Stone, 1885–1925), head football coach for the University of Tennessee, 1910

Politicians
Andrew Stone (MP) (1703–1773), British MP for Hastings, 1741–1761
Andrew Stone, Baron Stone of Blackheath (born 1942), Labour member of the House of Lords

Others
Andrew Leete Stone (1815–1892), author, Civil War chaplain and pastor
Andrew Stone (computer programmer) (born 1956), American computer programmer
Andrew H. Stone (fl. 1980s–2020s), American judge in the State of Utah
Andrew Stone (Pineapple Dance Studios), dance instructor at Pineapple Dance Studios, Covent Garden, London
Andrew L. Stone (1902–1999), American screenwriter, director, and producer
Andy Stone, only permanent member of music group Vince Vance & the Valiants